David Nicholas,  (born 1 December 1991) is an Australian cyclist.  He won silver and gold medals at the 2012 London Paralympics and a gold medal at the 2016 Rio Paralympics and a bronze medal at the 2020 Tokyo Paralympics.

Personal
David Aron Nicholas was born on 1 December 1991 in Rockhampton. He has cerebral palsy. Other sports he participates include karate.  he lived in the Queensland town of Proserpine. where he worked as IT Support Officer at Whitsunday Regional Council.

Nicholas now lives in Bathurst NSW, where he lives with his fiancé Emilie Miller, herself an accomplished international athlete.

Cycling

Nicholas is a C3 classified cyclist who competes in road and track events. At the 2011 UCI Para-cycling Road World Championships in Roskilde, Denmark, he won the gold medal in the Men's Time Trial C3 and silver medal in the Men's Road Race C3. In 2012, he participated in the UCI Para-cycling Track World Championships in Los Angeles, where he finished first in the C3 3 km individual pursuit. In the lead up to the 2012 London Paralympics, he participated in the Blenheim Palace festival of cycling time trial event. 
At the games, Nicholas won a gold medal in the Men's Individual C 3 Road Time Trial and a bronze medal in the Men's Individual C1–3 Road Race. He also participated in the Men's 1 km Time Trial C1–3, Men's Individual Pursuit C3 and Mixed Team Sprint C1–5 events.

Competing at the 2013 Para-cycling Road World Championships, Baie-Comeau, Canada, he won a gold medal in the Men's Individual Time Trial C3. At the 2014 UCI Para-cycling Track World Championships in Aguascalientes, Mexico, he won a bronze medal in the Men's 3 km Individual Pursuit C3.

At the 2015 UCI Para-cycling Road World Championships Nottwil, Switzerland, he finished seventh in the Men's Time Trial C3 and Men's Road Race C3.

Nicholas won the gold medal in the Men's 3 km Individual Pursuit C3 at the 2016 Rio Paralympics. He set a Paralympic record of 3:32.336 in qualifying for the gold medal race. His other results were fourth in the Men's Road Time Trial C3 and fifth in the Men's Road Time Trial C3 and sixth in the Mixed Sprint.

At the 2017 UCI Para-cycling Track World Championships in Los Angeles, United States, Nicholas won the gold medal in the Men's 3 km Individual Pursuit C3, a silver medal in Men's 1 km Time Trial C3 and a bronze medal in the Men's Scratch Race C1-3.

At the 2017 UCI Para-cycling Road World Championships, Pietermaritzburg, South Africa, he finished ninth in the Men's Time Trial C3 and 13th in the Men's Road Race C1-3.
 
At the 2018 UCI Para-cycling Track World Championships in Rio de Janeiro, Brazil, Nicholas won the gold medal in the Men's 3 km Individual Pursuit C3.

At the 2018 UCI Para-cycling Road World Championships, Rio de Janeiro, Brazil, he won the gold medal in the Men's 3 km Pursuit C3

Nicholas won a third straight world crown in C3 individual pursuit category at the 2019 UCI Para-cycling Track World Championships in Apeldoorn, Netherlands. He also won the gold medal in the Men's Scratch Race C3 and finished third in the Omnium Test Event C3.

At the 2019 UCI Para-cycling Road World Championships, Emmen, Netherlands, he won the gold medal in the Men's Time Trial C3 and tenth in the Men's Road Race C3.

At the 2020 UCI Para-cycling Track World Championships, Milton, Ontario, he won the gold medal in the Men's Individual Pursuit C3 and finished sixth in the Men's Scratch Race C3.

Nicholas won his fourth Paralympic medal, in winning the bronze medal in the Men's 3km Pursuit C3 at the 2020 Summer Paralympics with a time of 3:25.877. He finished 18th in the Men's Road Race C1–3 and eighth in the Men's Road Time Trial C3.

At the 2022 UCI Para-cycling Track World Championships in  Saint-Quentin-en-Yvelines, France, he won the bronze medal in Men's Omnium C4.

Recognition
He was awarded an Order of Australia Medal in the 2014 Australia Day Honours "for service to sport as a Gold Medallist at the London 2012 Paralympic Games." In November 2016, he was awarded the Sporting Wheelies and Disabled Association Sporting Wheelie of The Year. He was awarded Cycling Australia's Male Elite Para-Cyclist for 2016 and 2017. In November 2017, he was awarded Queensland Sport Athlete with a Disability.

References

External links
 
 Australian Cycling Team Profile
 
 

Paralympic cyclists of Australia
Cyclists at the 2012 Summer Paralympics
Cyclists at the 2016 Summer Paralympics
Cyclists at the 2020 Summer Paralympics
Paralympic gold medalists for Australia
Paralympic bronze medalists for Australia
Cerebral Palsy category Paralympic competitors
Cyclists with cerebral palsy
Cyclists from Queensland
Sportspeople from Rockhampton
1991 births
Living people
Recipients of the Medal of the Order of Australia
Medalists at the 2012 Summer Paralympics
Medalists at the 2016 Summer Paralympics
Sportsmen from Queensland
Australia at the 2016 Summer Paralympics
Australian male cyclists
Paralympic medalists in cycling
Medalists at the 2020 Summer Paralympics
21st-century Australian people